The UK Albums Chart is one of many music charts compiled by the Official Charts Company that calculates the best-selling albums of the week in the United Kingdom. Since 2004 the chart has been based on the sales of both physical albums and digital downloads. This list shows albums that peaked in the Top 10 of the UK Albums Chart during 2017, as well as albums which peaked in 2016 and 2018 but were in the top 10 in 2017. The entry date is when the album appeared in the top 10 for the first time (week ending, as published by the Official Charts Company, which is six days after the chart is announced).

One-hundred and ninety-five albums were in the top 10 this year. One album from 2015 and twelve albums from 2016 remained in the top 10 for several weeks at the beginning of the year. Dua Lipa by Dua Lipa was released in 2017 but did not reach its peak until 2018. Dua Lipa and Pete Tong were among the many artists who achieved their first UK charting top 10 album in 2017.

Glory Days by Little Mix returned to number-one for the first three weeks of 2017. The first new number-one album of the year was I See You by The xx. Overall, twenty-nine different albums peaked at number-one in 2017, with twenty-nine unique artists hitting that position.

Background

Chart debuts
The following table (collapsed on desktop site) does not include acts who had previously charted as part of a group and secured their first top 10 solo album, or featured appearances on compilations or other artists recordings.

Soundtracks
Four soundtrack albums for various films entered the top 10 throughout the year. These included Beauty and the Beast, La La Land, Moana and Trolls.

Best-selling albums
Ed Sheeran had the best-selling album of the year with ÷. Human by Rag'n'Bone Man came in second place. Sam Smith's The Thrill of It All, Glory Days from Little Mix and Beautiful Trauma by Pink made up the top five. Albums by Ed Sheeran (×), Michael Ball & Alfie Boe, Drake, Liam Gallagher and Stormzy were also in the top ten best-selling albums of the year.

Top-ten albums
Key

Entries by artist
The following table shows artists who achieved two or more top 10 entries in 2017, including albums that reached their peak in 2016. The figures only include main artists, with featured artists and appearances on compilation albums not counted individually for each artist. The total number of weeks an artist spent in the top ten in 2015 is also shown.

Notes

 Ladies and Gentlemen: The Best of George Michael originally peaked at number-one upon its initial release in 1998. Following George Michael's death on Christmas Day 2016, the album re-entered the top 10 at number 8 on 5 January 2017 (week ending). It re-entered the top 10 again at number 4 on 19 January 2017 (week ending), at number 8 on 9 March 2017 (week ending) and at number 9 on 26 October 2017 (week ending).
 × originally peaked at number-one upon its initial release in 2014.
 + originally peaked at number-one upon its initial release in 2011.
 Time Flies... 1994–2009 originally peaked at number-one upon its initial release in 2010. It re-entered the top 10 at number 8 on 15 June 2017 (week ending) following Liam Gallagher's performance at the One Love Manchester concert at Old Trafford.
 Adiós re-entered the top 10 at number 2 on 17 August 2017 (week ending) following Glen Campbell's death.
 The Ultimate Collection originally peaked at number 7 upon its initial release in 2011.
 The 50 Greatest Hits originally peaked at number 8 upon its initial release in 2000. It reached a brand new peak of number 2 in 2017 when it was re-released to coincide with the 40th anniversary of Elvis Presley's death.
 Figure includes album that peaked in 2016.

See also
2017 in British music
List of number-one albums from the 2010s (UK)

References
General

Specific

External links
2017 album chart archive at the Official Charts Company (click on relevant week)

United Kingdom top 10 albums
Top 10 albums
2017